is a Japanese track and field sprinter who specialized in the 400 metres. He competed in the 4 × 400 metres relay at the 2014 World Indoor Championships without qualifying for the final.

Personal best

International competition

National title

References

External links

1996 births
Living people
Sportspeople from Shizuoka Prefecture
Japanese male sprinters